The Quad is an American drama series created by Felicia D. Henderson and Charles Holland that aired on BET. The series premiered on February 1, 2017, with a 2-hour pilot movie.

The Quad stars Anika Noni Rose as Dr. Eva Fletcher, a newly elected President of the fictional Georgia A&M University. It also stars Ruben Santiago-Hudson, Sean Blakemore and Jasmine Guy. On April 27, 2017, BET renewed the show for a second season, which premiered on January 23, 2018. On April 9, 2018, BET cancelled The Quad.

Cast and characters

Main

 Anika Noni Rose as Dr. Eva Fletcher, the newly-elected first female president of Georgia A&M University
 Jazz Raycole as Sydney Fletcher, Eva's rebellious daughter
 Peyton Alex Smith as Cedric Hobbs, a hotheaded hip-hop musician
 Ruben Santiago-Hudson as Cecil Diamond, GAMU's egocentric band director
 Zoe Renee as Noni Williams
 Michelle DeFraites as Madison Kelly
 Jake Allyn as Bojohn Folsom
Robert Crayton as Ramil Smalls
 Sean Blakemore as Eugene Hardwick
 E. Roger Mitchell as Carlton Pettiway
 Jasmine Guy as Ella Grace Caldwell
 Katlynn Simone as Browyn
 Erica Michelle as Ebonie Weaver
 Miles J Stroter as Junior

Episodes

Season 1 (2017)

Season 2 (2018)

Critical reception 
The Quad has received positive reviews from television critics. On Rotten Tomatoes the season has a rating of 100%, based on 5 reviews. On Metacritic, the season has a score of 70 out of 100, based on 6 critics, indicating "generally favorable reviews".

References

External links

 
 

Will Packer Productions television shows
2017 American television series debuts
2018 American television series endings
2010s American drama television series
English-language television shows
BET original programming
Television shows set in Atlanta
Television shows filmed in Georgia (U.S. state)
2010s American black television series
American black television series